A disintegrin and metalloproteinase with thrombospondin motifs 5 also known as ADAMTS5 is an enzyme that in humans is encoded by the ADAMTS5 gene.

Function 

ADAMTS5 is a member of the ADAMTS (a disintegrin and metalloproteinase with thrombospondin motifs) protein family. Members of the family share several distinct protein modules, including a propeptide region, a metalloproteinase domain, a disintegrin-like domain, and a thrombospondin type 1 (TS) motif. Individual members of this family differ in the number of C-terminal TS motifs, and some have unique C-terminal domains. The enzyme encoded by this gene contains two C-terminal TS motifs and functions as aggrecanase to cleave aggrecan, a major proteoglycan of cartilage. ADAMTS5 may also have a role in the pathogenesis of human osteoarthritis.

Animal studies 

Genetically modified mice in which the catalytic domain of ADAMTS5 was deleted are resistant to cartilage destruction in an experimental model of osteoarthritis. ADAMTS5 is the major aggrecanase in mouse cartilage in a mouse model of inflammatory arthritis.

References

Further reading

External links 
 The MEROPS online database for peptidases and their inhibitors: M12.225
Rat Genome Database
 

EC 3.4.24
ADAMTS